The Minnesota Democratic–Farmer–Labor Party (DFL) is the Minnesota affiliate of the U.S. Democratic Party. As of 2023, it controls four of Minnesota's eight U.S. House seats, both of its U.S. Senate seats, the Minnesota House of Representatives and Senate, and all other statewide offices, including the governorship, making it the dominant party in the state.

The party was formed by a merger between the Minnesota Democratic Party and the Minnesota Farmer–Labor Party in 1944.

The DFL is one of two state Democratic Party affiliates with a different name to the national party, the other being the North Dakota Democratic–Nonpartisan League Party.

History

The DFL was created on April 15, 1944, with the merger of the Minnesota Democratic Party and the larger Farmer–Labor Party. Leading the merger effort were Elmer Kelm, the head of the Minnesota Democratic Party and the founding chairman of the DFL; Elmer Benson, effectively the head of the Farmer–Labor Party by virtue of his leadership of its dominant left-wing faction; and rising star Hubert H. Humphrey, who chaired the Fusion Committee that accomplished the union and then went on to chair its first state convention.

By the party's second convention in 1946, tensions had re-emerged between members of the two former parties. While the majority of delegates supported left-wing policies, Humphrey managed to install a more conservative ally, Orville Freeman, as party secretary. Some Farmer–Labor leaders such as Benson moved to the Progressive Party.

Freeman was elected the state's first DFL governor in 1954. Important members of the party have included Humphrey and Walter Mondale, who each went on to be United States senators, vice presidents of the United States, and unsuccessful Democratic nominees for president; Eugene McCarthy, a U.S. senator who ran for the Democratic presidential nomination in 1968 as an anti-Vietnam War candidate; and Paul Wellstone, a U.S. senator from 1991 to 2002 who became an icon of populist progressivism.

Current elected officials

Members of Congress

U.S. Senate
Democrats have held both of Minnesota's seats in the U.S. Senate since 2009:

U.S. House of Representatives
Out of the eight seats Minnesota is apportioned in the U.S. House of Representatives, four are held by Democrats:

Statewide officials
The Democratic–Farmer–Labor Party controls all five of the elected statewide offices:

State legislative leaders
President of the Senate: Bobby Joe Champion
Senate Majority Leader: Kari Dziedzic
House Speaker: Melissa Hortman
House Majority Leader: Jamie Long

Mayors
 Minneapolis: Jacob Frey (1)
 Saint Paul: Melvin Carter (2)
 Duluth, Minnesota: Emily Larson

Current leadership
 Chair: Ken Martin (since 2011)
 Party Vice Chair: Marge Hoffa (since 2011)
 Second Vice Chair: Shivanthi Sathanandan (since 2021)
 Treasurer: Leah Midgarden (since 2021)
 Secretary: Ceri Everett (since 2021)
 Outreach Officer: Cheniqua Johnson (since 2021)

Past chairs 

 Mark Andrew (1995-1997)
 Richard Senese (1997-1999)

See also

 List of political parties in Minnesota
 Political party strength in Minnesota
 Politics of Minnesota

References

Further reading
 Delton, Jennifer A. Making Minnesota Liberal: Civil Rights and the Transformation of the Democratic Party. Minneapolis: University of Minnesota Press, 2002.
 Haynes, John Earl. "Farm Coops and the Election of Hubert Humphrey to the Senate". Agricultural History 57, no. 2 (Fall 1983).
 Haynes, John Earl. Dubious Alliance: The Making of Minnesota's DFL Party. Minneapolis: University of Minnesota Press, 1984.
 Henrickson, Gary P. Minnesota in the "McCarthy" Period: 1946–1954. Ph.D. diss. University of Minnesota, 1981.
 Lebedoff, David. The 21st Ballot: A Political Party Struggle in Minnesota. Minneapolis: University of Minnesota Press, 1969.
 Lebedoff, David. Ward Number Six. New York: Scribner, 1972. Discusses the entry of radicals into the DFL party in 1968.

External links

 

 
Democratic Party (United States) by state
Democratic-Farmer-Labor Party
Political parties established in 1944
1944 establishments in Minnesota